Emilio Orozco Plascencia (born April 29, 1992) is an American soccer player who currently plays for Oxnard Guerreros FC in the National Premier Soccer League.

Career

Club
After graduating from High School, Orozco joined Mexican Primera División side Tigres de la UANL.  On March 19, 2012, Orozco joined NASL side Fort Lauderdale Strikers on a season-long loan.  On April 21, Orozco made his debut for the club, coming on as a 71st minute sub in a 2–2 draw on the road against San Antonio Scorpions FC.

On February 27, 2013, Chivas USA announced that Orozco and Josue Soto had joined the club after impressing during a pre-season trial.

On March 24, 2015, Orozco signed with Real Monarchs.

International
Orozco has represented the United States at the Under 17 and Under 20 level.

Honors
Real Monarchs
 USL Championship Regular Season Title: 2017

References

External links
Fort Lauderdale Strikers bio

1992 births
Living people
American soccer players
Tigres UANL footballers
Fort Lauderdale Strikers players
Chivas USA players
Real Monarchs players
American sportspeople of Mexican descent
Soccer players from California
North American Soccer League players
USL Championship players
United States men's youth international soccer players
United States men's under-20 international soccer players
Association football defenders
National Premier Soccer League players
American expatriate soccer players
American expatriate sportspeople in Mexico
Expatriate footballers in Mexico
Sportspeople from Oxnard, California